Beach Road railway station was a minor railway station or halt/request stop in north Devon, close to Westward Ho!, serving the residents of Eastboune Terrace and the outlying areas of Westward Ho!.

History 
This was the last stop before Northam that was the terminus station on the line in 1901 prior to the extension to Appledore of 1908.

Infrastructure
Beach Road Halt had no shelter or platform. A level crossing was located nearby, however the gates were removed in 1905. It had no freight facilities.

Micro history
In January 1901, the first train, with one carriage, ran from Bideford to Northam carrying a few friends of the Directors.

Jack Shears, who lived at Northam, was one of the trackmen who worked to maintain the permanent way.

No photographs appear to exist of Beach Road Halt.

References 

Notes

Sources

 Baxter, Julia & Jonathan (1980). The Bideford, Westward Ho! and Appledore railway 1901-1917. Pub. Chard. .
 Christie, Peter (1995). North Devon History. The Lazarus Press. .
 Garner, Rod (2008). The Bideford, Westward Ho! & Appledore Railway. Pub. Kestrel Railway Books. .
 Griffith, Roger (1969). The Bideford, Westward Ho! and Appledore Railway. School project and personal communications. Bideford Museum.
 Jenkins, Stanley C. (1993). The Bideford, Westward Ho! and Appledore Railway. Oxford : Oakwood Press. .
 Stuckey, Douglas (1962). The Bideford, Westward Ho! and Appledore Railway 1901-1917. Pub. West Country Publications.

Disused railway stations in Devon
Former Bideford, Westward Ho! and Appledore Railway stations
Railway stations in Great Britain opened in 1901
Railway stations in Great Britain closed in 1917
Torridge District